AE1 or AE-1 is a designation that may refer to one of the following:

Military
 AE1, Aviation Electrician's Mate First Class, an occupational rating in the United States Navy
 Aero Ae 01, a design of Czechoslovakian military trainer biplane entering use in 1919
 Aichi AE1A Atsuta, a Japanese aircraft engine of World War II
 HMAS AE1, the first submarine to serve in the Royal Australian Navy
 , a ammunition ship of the United States Navy

Other
 2022 AE1, an asteroid discovered in 2022
 AE1, a size designation for Constantinian bronze coins
 AE1, Anion Exchanger 1, a transport protein
 AE1/AE3, an antibody cocktail used in immunohistochemistry
 Air Energy AE-1 Silent, a German self-launching ultralight sailplane
 Canon AE-1, a 35 mm film, single-lens reflex (SLR) camera

See also